Abel Luciatti (born February 18, 1993) is an Argentine footballer, who plays as a centre-back for Tigre.

Career
Abel Luciatti joined J2 League club Renofa Yamaguchi FC in 2017.

References

External links

1993 births
Living people
Argentine footballers
Argentine expatriate footballers
Association football defenders
San Lorenzo de Almagro footballers
Club Almagro players
Renofa Yamaguchi FC players
Club Atlético Platense footballers
San Martín de Tucumán footballers
Club Atlético Tigre footballers
Primera Nacional players
J2 League players
Primera B Metropolitana players
Argentine expatriate sportspeople in Japan
Expatriate footballers in Japan